The Scarlet Spider is an alias used by several fictional characters appearing in American comic books published by Marvel Comics, most notably Ben Reilly and Kaine Parker, both of whom are genetic replicates of the superhero Spider-Man.

Both the Ben Reilly and Kaine Parker incarnations of Scarlet Spider will appear in Spider-Man: Across the Spider-Verse.

Fictional character biography

Ben Reilly

Benjamin "Ben" Reilly, a clone of the original Spider-Man created by the Jackal, is the first major version of the Scarlet Spider.

Peter Parker

To continue his superhero activities, Peter Parker was forced to use the Scarlet Spider identity due to all of his Spider-Man costumes being ruined, while Ben Reilly pretended to be the former in prison.

Joe Wade
Joseph "Joe" Wade is the only character to operate as a villain under the Scarlet Spider alias. An undercover FBI agent, he's assigned to investigate the second Doctor Octopus. However, Doctor Octopus discovers Joe and traps his body in a virtual reality chamber before using his thoughts to power a hard-light holographic duplicate of the Scarlet Spider to tarnish the Scarlet Spider name. Despite this, Joe is unable to stop himself from committing acts of violence. The true Scarlet Spider (Ben Reilly) attacks Doctor Octopus' lair, damaging the machine while Joe is still inside. This turned Joe into a mechanized version of the Scarlet Spider with superhuman strength and speed, claws on his fingertips, the ability to fire webbing from his wrists, crawl up walls, and fire laser "stingers" from his eyes. After the imposter goes on a rampage, the second Spider-Man (Ben Reilly) joins forces with the New Warriors to stop the cybernetic Scarlet Spider before the FBI put him in custody so Joe can undergo medical treatment to remove the technology.

Scarlet Spiders (Red Team)

The Scarlet Spiders, secretly all clones of Michael Van Patrick, work with the Initiative and wear advanced versions of the Iron Spider armour.

Kaine Parker

Kaine Parker, a clone of the original Spider-Man also created by the Jackal, is the fifth major version of the Scarlet Spider.

Other versions

MC2

In the alternate future MC2, Felicity Hardy, daughter of Felicia Hardy and Flash Thompson, adopts the Scarlet Spider identity to irritate her mother. She attempts to convince Spider-Girl to take her on as a sidekick, but the latter refuses. Undeterred, she continues to fight crime until several near-death experiences cause her to give up the identity.  Although she has no actual powers, she is skilled in martial arts and gymnastics and utilizes an array of spider-themed weaponry.

Spider-Gwen
The Spider-Gwen universe's Mary Jane Watson dresses as the Scarlet Spider for Halloween.

In other media

Television
 The Ben Reilly incarnation of the Scarlet Spider made a cameo appearance in Fantastic Four.
 The Ben Reilly incarnation of the Scarlet Spider appears in Spider-Man: The Animated Series, voiced by Christopher Daniel Barnes.
 Joe Wade makes a cameo appearance in The Spectacular Spider-Man episode "Shear Strength". This version is an African-American FBI agent.
 The Ben Reilly incarnation of the Scarlet Spider (hybridized with Kaine Parker) appears in Ultimate Spider-Man, voiced by Scott Porter.  
 Additionally, the original Scarlet Spider costume appears as Flash Thompson's initial superhero identity.
 The original Scarlet Spider costume appears in Marvel's Spider-Man (2017) as Peter Parker / Spider-Man's homemade costume.

Film
 Peter Parker's homemade Spider-Man suit from the Marvel Cinematic Universe (MCU) films Captain America: Civil War (2016) and Spider-Man: Homecoming (2017) pays homage to the original Scarlet Spider.
 Both the Ben Reilly and Kaine Parker incarnations of Scarlet Spider will appear in Spider-Man: Across the Spider-Verse as members of Miguel O'Hara's Spider-Forces.

Video games
 The Ben Reilly incarnation of the Scarlet Spider appears as an alternate skin for Peter Parker / Spider-Man in Spider-Man (2000), Spider-Man 2: Enter Electro, Marvel: Ultimate Alliance, Spider-Man: Shattered Dimensions, Ultimate Marvel vs. Capcom 3, and Spider-Man: Edge of Time.
 The Ben Reilly incarnation of the Scarlet Spider appears as a playable character in Marvel Super Hero Squad Online, voiced by Chris Cox. 
 The Kaine Parker incarnation of the Scarlet Spider appears as alternate costume for Peter Parker / Spider-Man in The Amazing Spider-Man and The Amazing Spider-Man 2 film tie-in games. 
 The Ben Reilly, Kaine Parker, Jon Wade, and Felicity Hardy incarnations of the Scarlet Spider all appear as playable characters in Spider-Man Unlimited.
 The Ben Reilly incarnation of the Scarlet Spider appears as a playable character in Lego Marvel Super Heroes 2.
 The Ben Reilly and Kaine Parker incarnations of the Scarlet Spider appear as alternate costumes for Peter Parker / Spider-Man in Spider-Man (2018).
 The Ben Reilly incarnation of the Scarlet Spider appears as a playable character in Marvel Future Fight.

See also
The Amazing Scarlet Spider
Scarlet Spider (volumes 1 and 2 of the series)
The Spectacular Scarlet Spider
Web of Scarlet Spider

References

Articles about multiple fictional characters
Fictional secret agents and spies
Marvel Comics superheroes
Clone characters in comics
Spider-Man characters code names